Lei Cheng Uk Estate is a public housing estate and Tenants Purchase Scheme estate in Lei Cheng Uk, downhill from Cheung Sha Wan, Kowloon, Hong Kong, located near the So Uk Estate. Since the redevelopment in 1980s, the estate consists of 10 residential buildings completed in 1984, 1989 and 1990 respectively. In 2002, some of the flats were sold to tenants through Tenants Purchase Scheme Phase 5. The estate is now managed by Hong Kong Housing Society.

History
In 1955, while levelling a hill to construct the Lei Cheng Uk Resettlement Area, workers discovered an ancient brick tomb dating to the Eastern Han Dynasty (25220CE). A total of 58 pottery and bronze objects were found inside the tomb. The site is now the Lei Cheng Uk Han Tomb Museum.

In 1956, during Double Ten Day celebrations, a government officer ordered that a Republic of China flag be removed from the Lei Cheng Uk estate. This escalated into the Hong Kong 1956 riots, where Pro-ROC camp (Hong Kong) and pro-Communists clashed.

Houses

Demographics
According to the 2016 by-census, Lei Cheng Uk Estate had a population of 12,043. The median age was 51.8 and the majority of residents (96 per cent) were of Chinese ethnicity. The average household comprised 2.6 persons. The median monthly household income of all households (i.e. including both economically active and inactive households) was HK$17,090.

See also 
 Public housing estates in Cheung Sha Wan
 San Wui Commercial Society YMCA of Hong Kong Christian School

References

External links

 Historical photographs of Lei Cheng Uk Resettlement Estate

Residential buildings completed in 1984
Residential buildings completed in 1989
Residential buildings completed in 1990
Cheung Sha Wan
Public housing estates in Hong Kong
Tenants Purchase Scheme